Arabs in Denmark are Danish permanent residents originating from Arab countries. The largest subpopulations found hail from Lebanon, Syria, Iraq, Palestine, and Morocco followed by smaller groups from other of the 21 Arab League countries.

The Danish Statistical Office reported the following for Q1 2017:

Most, but not all, are war refugees.

Notable people
Adda Djeziri, football of Algerian descent
Ahmad Abu Laban, imam and the leader of the organization of Palestinian descent
Ahmad Kaddour, boxer of Lebanese descent
 Ahmed Abu Laban (1946–2007), non-citizen, imam, Leader of the Islamic Society of Denmark 
 Ahmed Akkari, teacher, author, former imam of Lebanese descent
 Aida Nadeem, musician of Iraqi descent
 Ali Kazim, actor of Iraqi descent
 Anja Al-Erhayem, filmmaker, born to Iraqi father and Danish mother
 Asmaa Abdol-Hamid, social worker and politician of Palestinian descent
 Basim, singer of Moroccan descent, represented Denmark in 2014 Eurovision Song Contest
Dar Salim, film and television actor Iraqi descent
Feras Agwa, rapper of mixed Egyptian-Syrian parents
Ihan Haydar, drummer and Percussionist of Iraqi descent
 Janus Bakrawi, actor of Palestinian and Polish descents
 Mahmoud El-Hajj, footballer Palestinian and Lebanese descent
 Mohamed Ali, mixed Egyptian-Iraqi parents, singer who appeared on Denmark's X Factor
Mustafa Hassan, footballer of Iraqi descent
 Naser Khader, politician of Syrian descent
Osama Akharraz, football of Moroccan descent
Souheib Dhaflaoui, footballer of Tunisian descent
 Tariq Hashim, director of Iraqi descent
 Yahya Hassan, poet, author and politician of Palestinian descent
 Youssef Toutouh, footballer of Moroccan descent 
 Zeena Zaki, Iraqi fashion designer born in Copenhagen

See also

 Arab diaspora
 Egyptian diaspora
 Immigration to Denmark
 Iraqi diaspora
 Iraqis in Denmark
 Islam in Denmark
 Lebanese diaspora
 Lebanese people in Denmark
 Moroccan diaspora
 Palestinian diaspora
 Syrian diaspora
 Syrians in Denmark
 Tunisian diaspora
Algerians

References

 
Islam in Denmark
 
Denmark
Middle Eastern diaspora in Denmark
Denmark